"Wild Wild West" is a song by American rapper Kool Moe Dee, released in 1988 as a second single from his second studio album How Ya Like Me Now. It was recorded in 1987 at Battery Studios in London, England, produced by Bryan "Chuck" New, LaVaba Mallison, Pete Q. Harris, Teddy Riley and Kool Moe Dee, and released via Jive Records.

The single peaked at number 62 on the US Billboard Hot 100 and number 4 on the US Billboard Hot R&B/Hip-Hop Songs.
It was later sampled by Will Smith in his 1999 song of the same name, featuring Kool Moe Dee (along with Dru Hill).  It was on the soundtrack for film Wild Wild West.

Music video
The music video features Kool Moe Dee in a western style town with snow on the ground and with back up dancers. The video was filmed at Wild West City, in Stanhope, NJ.

Track listing

Personnel
Mohandas Dewese - songwriter, performer, producer
Bryan "Chuck" New - mixing, engineer, producer
Edward Theodore Riley - producer
Peter Brian Harris - producer
LaVaba Edourd Vonzell Mallison - producer

Charts

References

External links 

1988 songs
1988 singles
Jive Records singles
Kool Moe Dee songs
Song recordings produced by Teddy Riley